Jan Koller (born 30 March 1973) is a Czech former professional footballer who played as a striker. He was noted for his height, strong physique, and heading ability.

He began his career at Sparta Prague, then moved to Belgium, where he became the Belgian First Division top scorer with Lokeren. He won the league championship twice with Anderlecht and the Belgian Golden Shoe. In 2001, he joined Borussia Dortmund, where he won the Bundesliga title in his first season and scored 73 goals in 167 official games over five campaigns. He moved frequently in his later career, with stops in France, Germany and Russia.

Koller is the all-time top scorer for the Czech Republic national team, with 55 goals in 91 appearances in a decade-long career starting in 1999. He represented the nation at three UEFA European Championships and the 2006 FIFA World Cup.

Club career

Early career
Koller started his football training as a goalkeeper, but was converted to striker by the time he started his professional career with Czech club Sparta Prague. He made his début for Sparta in the spring of 1995 in a match against Benešov, coming on as a substitute with 20 minutes of the game remaining. In 1996, Koller caught the eye of Belgian football and signed with the club Lokeren for a fee equivalent to €102,000.

Anderlecht
After a successful three-year stint, in which he managed to finish as Belgian First Division top-scorer in his last season at Lokeren, Koller was signed by Belgian club Anderlecht. He quickly built up a successful partnership with Canadian striker Tomasz Radzinski, excelling in his debut season and earning him the Belgian Golden Shoe in 2000. At the end of the season, he was bought by German side Borussia Dortmund after turning down English side Fulham.

Borussia Dortmund

While Koller was at Dortmund, the club won the 2001–02 Bundesliga, thanks in part to Koller's 11 league goals. Besides the Bundesliga title his biggest success whilst at Dortmund was helping them to the 2002 UEFA Cup Final, where his goal could not prevent them losing 3–2 to Feyenoord.

His training as a goalkeeper saw some use in the 2002–03 season. In a Bundesliga match against Bayern Munich, Dortmund's goalkeeper Jens Lehmann was sent off in the second half for a second yellow card, and Dortmund had already used their three substitutions. Koller, who had already opened the scoring in the 8th minute, moved from striker to goalkeeper after 67 minutes of the match. He prevented any more goals for the rest of the match, despite Dortmund having been reduced to nine players due to the earlier expulsion of Torsten Frings. Koller was named by kicker as the Bundesliga's top goalkeeper of the week for his performance.

Monaco and Nürnberg
In a surprising move, Koller signed with French side AS Monaco in 2006 but a two-season disappointing campaign, despite a decent scoring record, forced him to move back to Germany to play with Nürnberg. Unfortunately for Koller, who wasn't the only Czech in the team as he was partnered with Tomáš Galásek and Jaromír Blazek, the Nürnberg-based club had performed poorly throughout the season and were relegated to 2. Bundesliga at the end of the 2007–08 season.

Later career

On 23 June 2008, Koller was transferred to Russian club Krylia Sovetov Samara in a deal worth €1 million. On 5 December 2009, Koller returned to France, joining Championnat National team AS Cannes, with a contract until June 2011. Koller announced his retirement from football in August 2011 after a series of injuries.

International career

Koller made his debut for the Czech Republic in a friendly away to Belgium at the King Baudouin Stadium in Brussels on 9 February 1999, and netted the only goal of the game in the 73rd minute. He scored six goals in six games in UEFA Euro 2000 qualifying as the Czechs topped their group; this included two in a 4–0 win in Lithuania. At the finals in Belgium and the Netherlands, he started each game as his team exited in the group stage. In 2002 FIFA World Cup qualification, Koller only scored twice in eight games, both in a 4–0 win over Iceland in Teplice.

His best performance in a major tournament was in Euro 2004, when his side reached the semi-finals and he scored two goals, forming a pivotal partnership with fellow striker Milan Baroš. He became the all-time leading scorer for the Czech Republic on 8 June 2005, following a match against Macedonia in which he scored four goals in just 11 minutes of a 6–1 win, taking his international total to 39. In the 2006 World Cup, Koller scored the opening goal of a 3–0 win against the United States in their first game, but later suffered a minor thigh injury; the Czech Republic lost their next two matches without him and were eliminated.

Into his third month with Nürnberg, Koller announced that he would retire from the Czech national team after Euro 2008. He finished his international career with 55 goals, including a crucial headed goal in their deciding Euro 2008 Group A match against Turkey; However, his goal was not enough as the Czechs conceded three goals in the last 15 minutes, losing the match 3–2, and failing to progress to the knock-out stage, prompting Koller to announce his retirement from the national team.

In July 2009, he announced that he would rejoin the national team because of poor results in the 2010 World Cup qualification. He played in the match against Slovakia, but on 6 September 2009, he again announced his retirement from international football.

Style of play 
Koller was particularly noted for his height, strong physique and heading ability, being referred to as a "towering forward" and a "human lighthouse". Due to his stature, he was often nicknamed Dino throughout his career.

Career statistics

Club

International
Appearances and goals by national team and year

Honours

Sparta Prague
 Czech First League: 1994–95
 Czech Cup: 1995–96

Anderlecht
 Belgian First Division: 1999–2000, 2000–01
 Belgian Supercup: 2000, 2001

Borussia Dortmund
 Bundesliga: 2001–02

Individual
 Belgian Pro League top scorer: 1998–99
 Czech Footballer of the Year: 1999
 Belgian Golden Shoe: 2000

References

External links

  
 

1973 births
Living people
Footballers from Prague
Association football forwards
Czech footballers
Czech Republic under-21 international footballers
Czech Republic international footballers
1. FC Nürnberg players
2006 FIFA World Cup players
AC Sparta Prague players
AS Cannes players
AS Monaco FC players
Belgian Pro League players
Borussia Dortmund players
Bundesliga players
Championnat National players
Czech expatriate footballers
Czech expatriate sportspeople in Belgium
Czech expatriate sportspeople in France
Czech expatriate sportspeople in Germany
Czech expatriate sportspeople in Monaco
Czech expatriate sportspeople in Russia
Czech people of German descent
Expatriate footballers in Belgium
Expatriate footballers in France
Expatriate footballers in Germany
Expatriate footballers in Monaco
Expatriate footballers in Russia
PFC Krylia Sovetov Samara players
K.S.C. Lokeren Oost-Vlaanderen players
Ligue 1 players
R.S.C. Anderlecht players
UEFA Euro 2000 players
UEFA Euro 2004 players
UEFA Euro 2008 players
Czech First League players
Russian Premier League players
Outfield association footballers who played in goal